In human anatomy, the term round ligament (or its Latin equivalent ligamentum teres) may refer to:

 Round ligament of uterus, also known as the ligamentum teres uteri
 Round ligament of liver, also known as the ligamentum teres hepatis
 Ligament of head of femur, which was formerly known as the ligamentum teres femoris
 Oblique cord or Round ligament of the elbow, connects the anterolateral aspect of the ulna proximally to the posteromedial aspect of the radius distally